The Juglar cycle is a fixed investment cycle of 7 to 11 years identified in 1862 by Clément Juglar. Within the Juglar cycle one can observe oscillations of investments into fixed capital and not just changes in the level of employment of the fixed capital (and respective changes in inventories), as is observed with respect to Kitchin cycles. 2010 research employing spectral analysis confirmed the presence of Juglar cycles in world GDP dynamics.

See also
Fixed investment
Business cycle

References

Further reading

External links
 Clement Juglar and the transition from crises theory to business cycle theories

Business cycle theories